Francisco Núñez (5 October 1924 – 31 August 1987) was an Argentine boxer. He competed at the 1948 Summer Olympics and the 1956 Summer Olympics.

References

External links
 

1924 births
1987 deaths
Argentine male boxers
Olympic boxers of Argentina
Boxers at the 1948 Summer Olympics
Boxers at the 1956 Summer Olympics
Pan American Games gold medalists for Argentina
Pan American Games medalists in boxing
Boxers at the 1951 Pan American Games
Place of birth missing
Featherweight boxers
Medalists at the 1951 Pan American Games